Mamona may refer to:

 Patrícia Mamona (born 1988), Portuguese triple jumper.
 Mammon, a demon or deity of greed or material wealth
 Mamona, or ternera a la llanera, a traditional type of Colombian and Venezuelan barbecue.
 Mamona, a name used in South America for Ricinus or castor oil plant